Basic beryllium acetate is the chemical compound with the formula Be4O(O2CCH3)6. This compound adopts a distinctive structure, but  it has no applications and has been only lightly studied. It is a colourless solid that is soluble in organic solvents.

Preparation
It can be prepared by treating basic beryllium carbonate with hot acetic acid.

 2  + 6 AcOH →  + 5  + 2 

Basic beryllium acetate is insoluble in water but soluble in chloroform, consistent with it being nonpolar.  It melts and sublimes in a vacuum without decomposition.

Structure
"Basic acetates" consist of an ensemble of metal centres bound to a central oxide ion, and a collection of acetate ligands.  Basic beryllium acetate has a tetrahedral Be4O6+ core with acetates (CH3CO2−) spanning each of the pairs of Be2+ centres. It  consists of interlocking six-membered Be2O3C rings.  The structure is relevant to its considerable stability (the compound is distillable at 330 °C).

Uses
The solubility of the salt in organic solvents (chloroform) is useful to extract and purify beryllium rich fractions for many purposes.
Basic beryllium acetate single crystals can easily be grown and are helpful to align x-ray diffractometers and also as a reference in protein crystallography.

See also
 Basic zinc acetate
 Basic beryllium nitrate

References

Beryllium compounds
Acetates